O'Grady (stylized as O*gRAdY) is an American animated television series created by Tom Snyder, Carl W. Adams, and Holly Schlesinger for Noggin's teen-oriented programming block, The N. The show was animated at Snyder's Soup2Nuts studio. It features the voices of H. Jon Benjamin, Melissa Bardin Galsky, Patrice O'Neal, and Holly Schlesinger playing a group of four 17-year-old teenagers living in the town of O'Grady. In each episode, the characters experience a different supernatural phenomenon while also facing ordinary high school challenges.

Plot
The series is set in the fictional town of O'Grady, which is periodically plagued by a force called "The Weirdness." The Weirdness affects its residents in strange ways, and its effects usually last for several days. For example, it causes people to project their private thoughts in bubbles over their heads, or produce clones of themselves every time they get angry. The focal characters of the show are four students of O'Grady High: Kevin, Abby, Harold, and Beth. In the first eight episodes, the former two would appear interviewing at Eets-A-Pizza for a cold opening, explaining that the Weirdness was caused by a "secret government program', but sometimes would get distracted into other things. The interviews would cease after "Cop 'Stache".

Characters

Main characters

 Kevin Harnisch (voiced by H. Jon Benjamin) is a slacker, aspiring bass player, and self-appointed "idea guy" who enjoys pulling pranks, heists, and schemes. He likes to find ways to use the Weirdness or other school events for his own gain, such as selling sugar in school as contraband during "Sugar Hill," asking road sign figures to spy on Abby during "Sign Language," or continuing his brothers' robot babysitting company during "Robo-Babies." Kevin is the youngest of 8 brothers. Kevin and his best friend Harold started a garage band, titled Brain Fart, but Kevin often gets distracted during rehearsals rather than practising. Brain Fart is occasionally joined by Iris, whom Kevin continuously pays to stay in the band during "O'Grady Idol." Different episodes heavily imply that Kevin has a crush on Abby, which he will not admit; nevertheless, his true feelings are sometimes revealed by the Weirdness.
 Abby Wilde (voiced by Melissa Bardin Galsky) is a fashion-oriented average teenager. She attempts to improve her life around her by trying to "help" Beth’s employer gain business by selling non-eco or vegan friendly items in a local health food store. Abby and Kevin have feelings for each other, as shown in many episodes. Abby's longtime love interest is Pete Klesko, but she never manages to make him feel the same way.
 Harold Oscar Jenkins (voiced by Patrice O'Neal) is Kevin's best friend, a mild-mannered goofball who works at Eets-A-Pizza. He can be a little nerdy and often is uncomfortable with Kevin's various schemes. He is genuinely kindhearted and good-spirited, and he likes hanging around with Kevin because he sees the good in him. Unlike Kevin, Harold does not have a fixed love interest and has expressed interest in multiple characters, including Stacey Monique during "Cop 'Stache" and, to a much lesser extent, Abby and Beth.
 Beth Briggs (voiced by Holly Schlesinger) is a blue-haired environmental activist and vegetarian. Her interests include thrifting vintage clothing at flea markets. She is a cashier and barista at local health cafe The Enchanted Soybean. Beth has been referred to as a "hippie" by Abby. Beth's grand ideals have led to interpersonal conflicts, especially between her and Abby. Despite their differences, Abby is Beth's best friend. Beth can be considered a foil to Kevin; whereas he is impulsive and anti-authoritarian, Beth is cautious and apprehensive about breaking rules. She has good intentions but can be overly trusting of other characters. In "Robo-Babies," she reveals that her family is Buddhist.

Supporting characters
 Phillip Bertrand Demorio (voiced by H. Jon Benjamin) is one of the smartest students at O'Grady High. A member of the school debate team, he is nerdy, wealthy, and is almost always seen wearing a tie. He speaks in an aristocratic British accent. He is often bullied by other students, including Kevin. Phillip professeses an interest in Abby during "Sign Language," but breaks up with her later in the episode, despite her disinterest. Phillip is shown to be arrogant and enjoys ballroom and disco dancing.
 Iris (voiced by H. Jon Benjamin) is a neurotic German exchange student and a devoted fan of techno music. She is part of Kevin and Harold's band. She speaks with an accent, is obsessed with chocolate, and often misunderstands what others are saying to her. She sometimes speaks entire sentences in German.
 Pete Klesko (voiced by Larry Murphy) is the most popular student in school. He plays on the lacrosse team, and Abby has had a crush on him for a long time, despite him not being able to remember her name. He has a very dull personality but is still nice.
 Donald Alan Lipschitz (voiced by Larry Murphy) is a monotone-speaking substitute teacher. He says "Oh, Lord" frequently whenever something bad happens. He also seems to suffer a reverse effect to every Weirdness. He has to teach classes whenever the staff become victims to the Weirdness and is often teaching every class the main characters attend.
 Dr. Myers (voiced by Bill Braudis) is the school principal. He has braces and is balding. He is not very intelligent or skilled at running the school. He and Mr. Lipschitz have a somewhat unnatural friendship, with both being a little annoyed of the other.

Additional voices
 Alonzo Bodden
 Amy Poehler
 Conan O'Brien
 Dannah Phirman
 David Cross
 Dina Pearlman
 Jon Glaser
 Mark Rivers
 Matt Walsh
 Paula Plum
 Rachel Dratch
 Rob Corddry
 Sam Seder
 Sirena Irwin
 Todd Barry
 Tom Kenny
 Will Arnett

Series overview

Episodes

Season 1 (2004–05)

Season 2 (2006)

Critical reception
The series received positive reviews from critics and was nominated for an Annie Award for "Best Writing in an Animated Television Production". Brian Zoromski of IGN claims it as "A wonderful half-hour of absurdity, O'Grady combines the comedy of the "weirdness" with realistic teenage banter, squabbles, and friendships."

Broadcast
The series originally aired on Noggin in the US as part of the channel's nighttime programming block for teenagers, The N. It aired on MTV in Latin America, Nickelodeon in the United Kingdom, Family Channel in Canada, and 2×2 in Russia.

Home releases
Although O'Grady has never been released on DVD, some episodes were made available on iTunes. It was available on Amazon Video. In 2014, a compilation called "Best of O'Grady" was released on iTunes.

References

External links

 

2000s American animated comedy television series
2000s American high school television series
2000s American teen sitcoms
2004 American television series debuts
2006 American television series endings
American animated sitcoms
American flash animated television series
English-language television shows
The N original programming
Squigglevision
Teen animated television series
Television series by Soup2Nuts
Television series created by Tom Snyder